Sinuatodostomia is a genus of sea snails, marine gastropod mollusks in the family Pyramidellidae, the pyrams and their allies.

Species
Species within the genus Sinuatodostomia include:
 Sinuatodostomia labunensis Robba, Di Geronimo, Chaimanee, Negri & Sanfilippo, 2004
 Sinuatodostomia nomurai van Aartsen & Corgan, 1996
 Sinuatodostomia somsaki Robba, Di Geronimo, Chaimanee, Negri & Sanfilippo, 2004

References

  Ronald G. Noseworthy, Na-Rae Lim, and Kwang-Sik Choi, A Catalogue of the Mollusks of Jeju Island, South Korea; Korean Journal of Malacology, Vol. 23(1): 65-104, June 30, 2007

External links
 To World Register of Marine Species

Pyramidellidae
Monotypic gastropod genera